The Birth of Adonis is a c.1506-1508 oil on panel painting attributed to Titian, now in the Musei civici in Padua. It shows the birth of Adonis from Ovid's Metamorphoses, forming a pair with The Legend of Polydoros.

It originated as part of a cassone, which entered its present home as a legacy from Emo Capodilista in 1864. Then attributed to Giorgione, it was later reattributed as an early work by Titian. Some art historians have also suggested an attribution to Romanino. At the centre is a group of figures freeing the child Adonis from his mother, who has just been transformed into a tree. To the left is a pair of lovers (referring to Adonis' conception), whilst on the left is his future lover Venus.

References

Paintings depicting Greek myths
Mythological paintings by Titian
Paintings in the Musei civici di Padova
1508 paintings
Paintings based on Metamorphoses